Line Geltzer Johansen (born 26 July 1989) is a Danish footballer who plays as a goalkeeper for the Denmark national team.

Club career
Line grew up in Aalborg, Denmark and featured for her hometown club AaB throughout her youth career, except from a short stint to B52/Aalborg FC. As part of her studies at university, Line went to London for a semester where she played for Watford Ladies FC in the Women's Premier League. Upon her return to Denmark, she made a move to Fortuna Hjørring but soon left the club and returned to AaB in search for more game time at senior level.

Master studies then opened an internship opportunity in Melbourne and Line made the move down under and joined Box Hill United SC in the Victorian Women's Premier League. It earned her a starting spot with the FFV WPL All Stars team and a train-on spot with Melbourne Victory in the W-League. An offer from the University of Queensland FC in the South East Queensland Women's Premier League saw her make the move to Brisbane where she had a successful season with the team. She returned to Denmark and joined Team Viborg in the Danish Elitedivisionen. In January 2015, she received her first offer of a full-time professional contract with Amazon Grimstad FK in Norwegian Toppserien. She played the full season at the club and spent her second pro year with Vålerenga IF in Norwegian Toppserien.

With the ambition of making it into the Danish Euro squad, she made a move home to Vejle Boldklub and amateur football for the spring of 2017. The gamble paid off in a spot as the third-choice goalkeeper with the Danish Euro team in July 2017 and later earned her the professional contract with Kopparbergs/Göteborg FC in Swedish Damallsvenskan from August 2017.

International career
Line has been involved with the national team since early 2015. She made her first international appearance for the Danish National Team on 28 January 2016 in a friendly against Netherlands. Line was capped three times and was part of the Danish squad that finished second in the UEFA European Championship 2017.

References

External links
 Player's Profile at Danish Football Association (DBU)
 Player's Profile at Euro Sport
 

1989 births
Living people
Denmark women's international footballers
Danish women's footballers
Watford F.C. Women players
Fortuna Hjørring players
Vålerenga Fotball Damer players
BK Häcken FF players
Avaldsnes IL players
Women's association football goalkeepers
Amazon Grimstad players
Toppserien players
Primera División (women) players
EdF Logroño players
Danish expatriate women's footballers
Expatriate women's soccer players in Australia
Expatriate women's footballers in England
Expatriate women's footballers in Spain
Expatriate women's footballers in Sweden
Expatriate women's footballers in Norway
Danish expatriate sportspeople in Australia
Danish expatriate sportspeople in England
Danish expatriate sportspeople in Norway
Danish expatriate sportspeople in Spain
Danish expatriate sportspeople in Sweden
FA Women's National League players
Damallsvenskan players
Sportspeople from Aalborg
UEFA Women's Euro 2017 players

Association football goalkeepers